Wes Caswell (born January 4, 1975) is a former American football wide receiver in the Arena Football League who played for the Oklahoma Wranglers. He played college football for the Tulsa Golden Hurricane.

References

1975 births
Living people
American football wide receivers
Oklahoma Wranglers players
Tulsa Golden Hurricane football players